Dubravko Bojić (born 1953) is a politician in Serbia. He has served in the National Assembly of Serbia since 2016 as a member of the Serbian Radical Party.

Private career
Bojić's parliamentary biography identifies him as a professor of Russian. He lives in Belgrade.

Member of the Assembly
Bojić received the seventeenth position on the Radical Party's electoral list for the 2016 Serbian parliamentary election and was declared elected when the party won twenty-two mandates. He currently serves as an opposition member of the assembly. He is a member of the parliamentary committee on education, science, technological development, and the information society; a deputy committee of the foreign affairs committee and the health and family committee; and a member of the parliamentary friendship groups for Belarus, Kazakhstan, Russia, and Spain.

In March 2017, Bojić participated in a Radical Party parliamentary delegation to Crimea to mark the three-year anniversary of the area's de facto joining of the Russian Federation. The government of Ukraine, which considers Crimea to be a part of its territory, issued a five-year travel ban to Bojić and other members of the delegation. Two months later, Bojić took part in a Radical Party delegation to the breakaway Donetsk People's Republic.

References

1953 births
Living people
Members of the National Assembly (Serbia)
Politicians from Belgrade
Serbian Radical Party politicians